J Saul Kane (born 1969) is an English DJ, musician who has released recorded material since 1987 as Depth Charge and The Octagon Man, amongst other noms de disc. He is also the owner of the record labels DC Recordings and Electron Industries.

He is well known for his pioneering use of samples, particularly from cult films in the martial arts, Spaghetti Western and pornographic genres. He has also made tracks celebrating his favourite football team (Brazil on the 1990 single "Goal") and player (on the 1998 single "Romário"). Kane is often credited for inventing "trip hop" and "big beat"; he used kung-fu film samples before Wu-Tang Clan. His other aliases include Alexander's Dark Band, T.E.T and Grimm Death.

As a confirmed kung-fu movie fan, Kane was involved in setting up the company Made in Hong Kong, which licensed Chinese movies, particularly those made by the Shaw Brothers. Many of these movies are examples of the heroic bloodshed genre (The Killer, A Moment of Romance). Made in Hong Kong was the first company to release Stephen Chow films on VHS in the UK.

Discography

Depth Charge

Albums
1994, 9 Deadly Venoms, CD/2LP, Vinyl Solution
1999, Lust, CD/2LP, DC Recordings
1999, Lust 2, CD/2LP, DC Recordings
2002, Spill - Rare & Unreleased Tracks 1993-1998, CD/2LP, DC Recordings

Singles
1989, "Depth Charge", 12", Vinyl Solution
1989, "Bounty Killers", 12", Vinyl Solution, UK No. 84
1990, "Goal", 12", Vinyl Solution
1990, "Dead By Dawn", 12", Vinyl Solution
1991, "Depth Charge vs. Silver Fox", 12", Vinyl Solution
1992, "Bounty Killer II", 12", Vinyl Solution
1994, "Hubba Hubba Hubba", 12", Vinyl Solution
1995, "Legend of the Golden Snake EP", 12"/10"/CD, DC Recordings [UK Number 75]
1995, "Shaolin Buddha Finger", 12", DC Recordings
1995, "Queen of the Scorpion", 10", DC Recordings
1996, "Sex, Sluts and Heaven", 10", R&S Records
1997, "Disko Vixen EP", 2x12", DC Recordings
1997, "Disko Alien", 10", DC Recordings
1998, "Disko Airlines", 2x12", DC Recordings
1998, "Romario", 12"/CD, DC Recordings [UK Number 84]
1998, "Blue Lipps", 12"/CD, DC Recordings [UK Number 96]
1999, "Bounty Killer 3 EP", 12", DC Recordings
2000, "The Goblin", 10", DC Recordings
2002, "Robotomo/Honour", 12", DC Recordings
2003, "I Dream (Depth Charge Vs. The Octagon Man)", 12", DC Recordings
2004, "Hi Voltage Man", 12", DC Recordings
2009, "Mecha Squirrel", 12", DC Recordings

The Octagon Man

Albums
1995, The Exciting World of the Octagon Man, CD/3LP, Electron Industries
2000, Ito Calculus, CD/2LP, DC Recordings
2003, Magneton, CD/2LP, DC Recordings

Singles
1989, "Free-er Than Free", 12", Vinyl Solution
1990, "The Demented Spirit", 12", Vinyl Solution
1995, "Biting the Dragon's Tail", 12", Electron Industries
1996, "The Rimm/Phonic Maze", 12", Electron Industries
1997, "10ft Flowers", 2x10", Electron Industries
1998, "Vidd", 12", Electron Industries
1998, "Zedd", 12", Electron Industries
2000, "Toy Boxx (The Octagon Man vs. Depth Charge)", 10", DC Recordings

References

External links
Discogs: Depth Charge
DC Recordings
The Exciting World of Jonathan Saul Kane @ pHinnWeb
Vice interview
Thumped interview (05/2008)

British DJs
1969 births
Living people